Johan Jacob Ferguson was a 17th-century Dutch mathematician who corresponded with Gottfried Wilhelm Leibniz.

Life 
He was born around 1630, probably in The Hague, and died before 24 November 1706, probably on 6 October 1691 in Amsterdam.

In his 1667 book Labyrinthus algebrae, written in low Dutch, he shows the solutions of cubic and biquadratic equations using new methods.
The book had a partial translation in Latin (lost) and was sent to Isaac Newton.

Works

References

1630 births
1691 deaths
17th-century Dutch mathematicians
Scientists from The Hague